One of New York State's 62 counties, Schoharie County was created with its own borders in 1795. The modern-day area of Schoharie County once fell under the boundaries of the expansive Albany County. Numerous times after the 1683 creation of Albany County, partitions of its area were divided up reassigning parts of the land under new dominions. Partitions that were designated in a 1795 change rendered a parcel to be known as Schoharie County from portions of Albany County's territory.

Although not an official county during the Revolution, modern-day Schoharie County highly regards the region’s historical presence of the time period relating to the American Revolution. Many local municipalities have long standing traditions associated with the late 18th century. Much of the folklore and heritage of the area in linked to the events of this era as well. Local communities pride themselves on the history of both the physical land, key figures and events in the area during the late 1700s. The land was of great significance during this time, both as a tactically strategic sight, and for its agricultural significance. Similar to today's Schoharie Valley, farms of this time period were substantial producers of vital crops for New England. Regularly referred to as "the breadbasket of the revolution," the fertile valley was invaluable to the Revolutionary forces. The agricultural output of the region was responsible for much of the sustenance provided to General George Washington's Army during much of the war.

In addition to the relevance of the area's crop output, the location along the Schoharie Creek was also a crucial aspect of its place in history. A considerable amount of the hostilities that occurred throughout the county were a result of the importance of the waterways surrounding the valley. Two major rivers within the northeast, the Mohawk and Hudson meet just north of Albany, NY, not far from Schoharie County. During the time of the American Revolution, the British looked to seize control of Albany, and therein control of the Hudson. The connection of the Hudson River from New England to the more southerly colonies was essential for the transportation of rations and supplies for the American forces. Severing this support system would have been devastating for the Continental troops, and the British forces knew this taking of the city would be extremely strategically advantageous.

In 1777, three British armies were poised to advance on Albany, commanded by General John Burgoyne. Two of these Aamies had come from in Canada via the Mohawk River and Lake Champlain waterway. During their march on Albany, the path led past the region now known as Schoharie County. The advancement of British troops caused quite a stir amongst many residents of the area. The conflict that would soon ensue created a division throughout the area. While many sided with the fight for a free America, a large loyalist uprising in the area began to take hold.

A number of notable historic figures of the Revolution played a part the uprising, in addition to Schoharie's involvement in the War. The Mohawk Sachem Joseph Brant (Thayendanega)) was famous throughout the war, as well as in local lore. Brant was widely known for his importance to the British forces, even having met with King George III at one time. Renowned for his role in recruiting loyalists and Natives Americans, Brant led these troops against the rebels for much of the war. Taking part in many major raids and battles in New York, Brant was feared by the rebels, and revered by the British. His presence was a factor in the outcome of many skirmishes throughout campaigns of the state. Most notably in the Schoharie area were Brant's role in the Battle of Cobleskill, the Battle of the Flockey, and his raids alongside Sir John Johnson in 1780. Along with Brant, some local residents garnered fame while aiding the loyalist uprising as well.

Local tavern owner George Mann is also well known throughout the region for his support of the crown. Mann was at one time a Captain in the Schohary Militia, but defected and recruited from within the militia's ranks to aid the Tories. The tavern owned by Mann was utilized as a meeting place for Tories and Indians, loyal to the Crown. While the recognition of these individuals is for their loyalties to England, distinction is also given to those who fought for the side of Revolution.

Known throughout the county, a hero of the Continental Army and Schoharie County during this era was Timothy Murphy. Murphy was a revered rifleman of Washington's army. During times of loyalist and British raids on the region, three forts had been erected to protect residents, due to the lack of proper military enforcement from the attacks. The Upper, Middle, and Lower Forts were spread apart along the banks of the Schoharie Creek. Murphy is credited with being an essential to the defense of the Middle Fort during an attack. Having already been admired as a hero of the Battle of Saratoga, he was able to largely partake in repelling attackers and leaving the residents unharmed. As the story goes, Murphy fired upon British forces that were coming to discuss the rebel surrender of the fort. Refusing to be taken prisoner, Murphy continued firing upon them, disregarding orders of a superior. This action led to the decision of the British command to back off of the fort and continue onward. Much of the folklore surrounding Murphy comes from his ability as rifleman, and his dedication as a patriot.

Other significance throughout the region came in many details of the conflicts that had occurred. The Battle of the Flockey was remarkable in that it was a continued attempt of the British and Loyalist forces to attain their goal of control over Albany. The battle was eventually won by the Americans, as they were reinforced by the 2nd Continental Light Horse Division. The importance of this action was not only in that it dispersed loyalist and Native forces, but in that it was the first official cavalry charge of the United States Army. After this period, raids still occurred throughout the area; loyalists, Natives, and Brits often terrorized local settlements. The lack of a large Continental Army presence in the area created opportunity for these forces to use to their advantage. Burning fields, crops, and buildings, the people of these communities were left in danger and disarray. This put a drastic damper on the output of resources for Washington’s army and created a need for protection of those who remained in the area. This is where the idea for the three forts along the creek arose. Stockades and other reinforcements around these structures created a safe haven for those threatened by the raids. The forts of Schoharie County are a large part of the district's historical identity.

Today much of the history of the American Revolution is still celebrated in Schoharie County. A number of historical sites and markers maintain a large portion of the area’s appeal for tourism. Just outside the village of Schoharie is the Old Stone Fort, which is a tourist attraction and part of a museum. During the Revolution, this was the stockade-reinforced Lower Fort, created to protect the local residents. Visitors can still see a cannonball hole in the outside of the structure from a loyalist and Indian raid, led by Joseph Brant and John Johnson. Along with the still-standing Old Stone Fort, the area around the fort is now a museum complex, with a number of structures representative of various eras in the county's history. Also outside of the village, restaurant and tavern "George Mann's Tory Tavern" may still be found. Although repaired and renovated, the tavern is still the same standing structure as was run by George Mann during the American revolution. Celebrated hero Timothy Murphy is remembered in the area by events in the region. Examples of such are that of the annual Timothy Murphy 10K run, and local theatre the Timothy Murphy Playhouse.

References

External links
http://www.schohariechamber.com/history
html http://theoldstonefort.org/Library/daysoftheflockey
html http://www.torytavern.com/history.php
http://hortonsarticles.org/Timeline1777.htm
http://old.thedailystar.com/opinion/columns/simonson/2003/05/simonson0524.
html http://upload.wikimedia.org/wikipedia/commons/a/ad/Albany_County_1777.png
http://theoldstonefort.org/Museums/index.html
http://dmna.ny.gov/historic/articles/murphy.htm

Schoharie County, New York
History of New York (state) by county
New York (state) in the American Revolution